Patrick Joseph Quinn Jr. (born December 16, 1948) is an American lawyer and politician who served as the 41st governor of Illinois from 2009 to 2015. A Democrat, Quinn began his career as an activist by founding the Coalition for Political Honesty.

Born in Chicago, Illinois, Quinn is a graduate of Georgetown University and Northwestern University School of Law. Quinn began his career as a tax attorney in private practice before working as an aide to then-Illinois Governor Dan Walker. He was elected to one term as a commissioner on the Cook County Board of Appeals, serving from 1982 to 1986; he later served as revenue director in the administration of Chicago Mayor Harold Washington.

Quinn served as Treasurer of Illinois from 1991 to 1995. In Illinois' 2002 gubernatorial election, Quinn won the Democratic nomination for Lieutenant Governor of Illinois in the primary and was paired with then-U.S. Representative Rod Blagojevich in the general election. He was sworn into office as lieutenant governor in 2003. Quinn assumed the governorship on January 29, 2009, after Governor Blagojevich was impeached and removed from office on corruption charges.

Quinn was narrowly elected to a full term in office in 2010, defeating Republican State Senator Bill Brady by a margin of less than 1% out of about 3.5 million votes cast. Quinn was narrowly defeated in 2014 by Republican candidate Bruce Rauner.
Quinn unsuccessfully ran in the Democratic primary for Attorney General of Illinois in 2018.

Early life and education

Quinn was born in 1948 in Chicago. His family moved to the suburb of Hinsdale, Illinois, when he was a child. The son of Eileen (Prindiville), a school secretary, and Patrick Joseph Quinn, a public relations official for the Roman Catholic Archdiocese of Chicago, his grandparents were Irish. He was reared a Catholic and attended the local Catholic elementary school, St. Isaac Jogues. He graduated in 1967 from Fenwick High School, a Catholic school in Oak Park, Illinois;  while at Fenwick, Quinn was the cross-country team captain and sports editor of the school newspaper. Quinn went on to graduate from Georgetown University in 1971 with a bachelor's degree from the Edmund A. Walsh School of Foreign Service, where he was a student of Professor Jan Karski and a sports editor for The Hoya. After taking a few years off from education, he earned a Juris Doctor degree from Northwestern University School of Law in 1980. In 1982, Quinn married Julie Ann Hancock. The marriage produced two sons, Davey Quinn and Patrick Quinn IV, before the couple's 1986 divorce.

From 1976 through 1978, he worked as an economist for the company Coilcraft.

Political activism
Before running for public office, Quinn was involved in political action, serving as an aide to Governor Daniel Walker from 1973 through 1975. He was first put on the political map in the late 1970s by leading a petition to amend the 1970 Illinois Constitution with the "Illinois Initiative". This amendment was intended to increase the power of public referendums in the political process and recalls for public officials. The petition drive was successful, but the Illinois Supreme Court ultimately ruled that the Illinois Initiative was an "unconstitutional constitutional amendment," and thus never was presented to voters.

Quinn drew more attention to his causes by holding press conferences on Sundays, seen as a slow news day. While still in law school, Quinn scored his first political success in 1980, earning a reputation as a reformer on the Illinois political scene. Through his organization, "The Coalition for Political Honesty," he initiated and led the statewide campaign for the Cutback Amendment to the Illinois Constitution, ultimately reducing the size of the Illinois House of Representatives from 177 to 118 members.

Early political career
In 1982, Quinn was elected as commissioner of the Cook County Board of Appeals, now known as the Cook County Board of Review. During his time on the board, Quinn was instrumental in the creation of the "Citizens Utility Board", a consumer watchdog organization.

Quinn did not seek re-election to the Cook County Board of Tax Appeals, in 1986, instead opting to run an unsuccessful campaign for the Democratic nomination for Illinois State Treasurer, losing to Jerome Cosentino. After this defeat, Quinn briefly served in the administration of Chicago Mayor Harold Washington as Revenue Director in 1987. Quinn also served on the local school council of Sayre Magnet School on Chicago's West Side.

State Treasurer
Quinn's bid for office was successful in the 1990 election for Illinois Treasurer, defeating Peg McDonnell Breslin in the Democratic primary and Greg Baise in the general election. Quinn campaigned as a populist reformer in opposition to big government.

He pledged during his campaign that he would seek to transform the office into a consumer advocate-style position. As a candidate, he refused to take campaign contributions from banking officials. He also pledged as a candidate to modernize the office and maximize returns on state deposits through use of electronic fund transfers and through expanding linked-deposit programs. He released an "Invest in Illinois" plan which proposed competitive bidding from financial institutions wanting to be state depositories. He also promised that he would not deposit or invest assets used to pay employee retirement benefits in junk bonds. He also pledged to implement a professional code of ethics for the office's employees.

He served in the position of Illinois Treasurer from 1991 to 1995. During this period, he was publicly critical of Illinois Secretary of State and future governor, George Ryan. Specifically, he drew attention to special vanity license plates that Ryan's office provided for cronies and the politically connected. This rivalry led Quinn to unsuccessfully challenge Ryan in the 1994 general election for Secretary of State, winning the Democratic primary but losing in the general.

U.S. Senate campaign

Quinn then took his aspirations to the national stage. When United States Senator Paul Simon chose not to seek re-election in 1996, Quinn entered the race. However Dick Durbin won the Democratic primary and eventually the Senate seat.

1998 lieutenant gubernatorial campaign

Quinn sought the Democratic nomination for lieutenant governor in 1998, but was narrowly defeated by Mary Lou Kearns. Quinn did not initially accept the count and charged fraud, but several weeks after the election he declined to ask the Illinois Supreme Court for a recount and endorsed Kearns.

In 1998, Quinn protested an increase in state legislators' salaries by urging citizens to send tea bags to the governor, Jim Edgar. The tactic was a reference to the Boston Tea Party. As lieutenant governor, he would later repeat this tactic in 2006, urging consumers to include a tea bag when paying their electricity bills, to protest rate hikes by Commonwealth Edison.

Lieutenant governor

Quinn won the Democratic nomination for lieutenant governor in March 2002, and subsequently won the general election on the Democratic ticket alongside gubernatorial nominee, Rod Blagojevich. In Illinois, candidates for lieutenant governor and governor at that time ran in separate primary elections, but were conjoined as a single ticket for the general election. This same ticket won re-election in 2006, where Quinn was unopposed in the primary. While Lieutenant Governor, according to his official biography, his priorities were consumer advocacy, environmental protection, health care, broadband deployment, and veterans' affairs.

On December 14, 2008, when Quinn was asked about his relationship with Blagojevich, he said, "Well, he's a bit isolated. I tried to talk to the Governor, but the last time I spoke to him was in August of 2007. I think one of the problems is the Governor did sort of seal himself off from all the statewide officials ... Attorney General Madigan and myself and many others."  Blagojevich had announced in 2006 that Quinn was not to be considered part of his administration.

Governor of Illinois

Succession and elections
On January 29, 2009, Rod Blagojevich was removed from office by a vote of 59–0 by the Illinois State Senate. Quinn became Governor of Illinois.

2010 gubernatorial election

In the Democratic primary for governor in 2010, Quinn defeated State Comptroller Daniel Hynes with 50.4% of the vote. On March 27, 2010, Illinois Democratic leaders selected Sheila Simon to replace Scott Lee Cohen on the ballot, after Cohen won the February 2010 Democratic primary to be Illinois' Lieutenant Governor, but later withdrew amid controversies involving his personal life.  In the general election Quinn's campaign aired television ads produced by Joe Slade White that repeatedly asked the question of his opponent, "Who is this guy?" Ben Nuckels was the general election Campaign Manager and was named a "Rising Star of Politics" by Campaigns & Elections magazine for his efforts with Quinn.

Quinn won the general election on November 2, 2010, by a narrow margin against Republican candidate Bill Brady. Quinn's victory was named by RealClearPolitics.com as the No. 5 General Election upset in the country; Politico said it was the 7th closest gubernatorial in American history.

2014 gubernatorial election

Quinn declared a run for re-election for 2014. In the summer of 2013, former White House Chief of Staff and former United States Secretary of Commerce William M. Daley declared a run for governor in the Democratic Primary against Quinn, but later dropped out. Quinn chose Paul Vallas, the former Chicago Public Schools CEO, as his running-mate. Quinn was challenged in the Democratic Primary by Tio Hardiman, the former director of CeaseFire, but won 72%-28% and faced Republican businessman Bruce Rauner for the general election.

The majority of major Illinois newspapers endorsed Rauner, but Quinn was endorsed by the Chicago Defender, the Rockford Register Star, and The Southern Illinoisan.

Quinn was defeated by Rauner in the general election, 50%-46%. He lost every county except Cook County. His term as governor ended on January 12, 2015.

Governorship
As governor, Quinn faced a state with a reputation for corruption—the two previous governors both went to federal prison—and after two years polls showed Quinn himself was the "Nation's most unpopular governor."  The main issue was a fiscal crisis in meeting the state's budget and its long-term debt as the national economic slump continued and Illinois did poorly in terms of creating jobs.  Quinn spoke often to the public and met regularly with state leaders, in stark contrast to Rod Blagojevich's seclusion from others. On August 20, 2013 Quinn signed a bill into law that raised the rural interstate speed limit in Illinois to 70 mph. It was previously 65 mph. The bill also raised the speed limit on the Illinois Toll Road. The law became effective at midnight January 1, 2014.

Budget, debt and taxes
Quinn announced several "belt-tightening" programs to help curb the state deficit. In July 2009, Quinn signed a $29 billion capital bill to provide construction and repair funds for Illinois roads, mass transit, schools, and other public works projects. The capital bill, known as "Illinois Jobs Now!", was the first since Governor George H. Ryan's Illinois FIRST plan, which was enacted in the late-1990s. On July 7, 2009, he for the second time in a week vetoed a budget bill, calling it "out of balance", his plan being to more significantly fix the budget gap in Illinois. In March 2009, Quinn called for a 1.5 percentage point increase in the personal income tax rate. To help offset the increased rate, he also sought to triple the amount shielded from taxation (or the "personal exemption") – from $2,000 per person to $6,000. However, the bill that eventually passed increased the personal income tax by 2%.

With the state budget deficit projected to hit $15 billion in 2011, the legislature in early 2011 raised the personal income tax from 3% to 5%, and the corporation profits tax 4.8% to 7%. Governor Quinn's office projected the new taxes will generate $6.8 billion a year, enough to balance the annual budget and begin reducing the state's backlog of about $8.5 billion in unpaid bills. A report from the Civic Federation in September 2011 projected a $8.3 billion deficit to end the budget year.

After three years of tax increases for workers and businesses, ending with an increase in corporate taxes in 2011 from 5% to 7%, the national recession left the economy in trouble.  During an annual budget address on February 22, 2012 to the Illinois Legislature, Quinn warned that the state's financial system was nearing collapse.  The Associated Press reported that Quinn feared Illinois was "on the verge of a financial meltdown because of pension systems eating up every new dollar and health care costs climbing through the roof."  According to the Civic Federation, Illinois is only able to remain solvent by not paying its bills on time.  Quinn advocated Medicaid and healthcare cuts totaling $1.6 billion in 2012; critics including Democratic State Representative Mary E. Flowers stated the cuts would remove hundreds of thousands of the poor and elderly from public health programs.  The unprecedented cuts were too small to resolve the long-term issue according to rating agencies that downgraded Illinois to the lowest credit rating of any US state in 2012.  As of November 2012, unpaid pension obligations totaled $85 billion with a backlog of $8 billion.

In an effort to reduce the state's financial obligations, in November 2012 Quinn cancelled contracts with the American Federation of State, County and Municipal Employees. Union officials contended that "Quinn wanted concessions so deep that they are an insult to every state employee,"  while the administration contended that the state is paying salaries and benefits at levels that "exceed the salaries and benefits of other unionized state workers across the country."  As of December 2012, Illinois had the fifth highest unemployment rate in the United States, and by March 2013, Illinois public-employee pension liability reached $100 billion.

Pat Quinn has been a major supporter of the controversial Illiana Expressway.

In 2009, Quinn signed into law the Video Gaming Act which legalized the use of video gambling machines in Illinois. Quinn had previously denounced video gambling as a "bad bet". Quinn said the legislation was necessary to make up revenue due to the recession. A 2019 ProPublica investigation found that Illinois gambling regulators were underfunded and understaffed, and the gambling failed to meet projected revenues for the state's public coffers.

Ethics reform and corruption allegations
On January 5, 2009, Quinn appointed Patrick M. Collins to chair the Illinois Reform Commission, which was tasked with making recommendations for ethical reform for Illinois government.

On February 20, 2009, Quinn called for the resignation of US Senator Roland Burris, the man appointed to the United States Senate by Blagojevich to fill the vacant seat created by the resignation of Barack Obama. He changed his position, however, following pressure from prominent African Americans who threatened electoral repercussions.

On March 3, 2009, the Associated Press reported that Quinn had "paid his own expenses" many times as lieutenant governor, contradicting Blagojevich's accusations against Quinn. As a rule, he either paid his own way, or stayed at "cut rate hotels" (such as Super 8), and never charged the state for his meals.

In June 2009, Quinn launched a panel, chaired by Abner Mikva, to investigate unethical practices at the University of Illinois amid fears that a prior investigation would be ineffective in instituting necessary reforms. The panel was charged with searching the admissions practices, amid reports that the public university was a victim of  corruption. The panel found evidence of favoritism and its investigation culminated in the resignation of all but two University trustees.

In Spring 2014, federal prosecutors and the Illinois Legislative Audit Commission launched an investigation into Quinn's $55 million Neighborhood Recovery Initiative, a program launched weeks before 2010 election.

On October 22, a federal judge appointed an independent monitor to oversee hiring at the Illinois Department of Transportation. This followed a three-year investigation by the Illinois executive inspector general that uncovered politically motivated hiring at IDOT, which started under Gov. Blagojevich.

Environment and energy

Quinn won generally high praise for his leadership on environmental issues, going back at least as far as when he was lieutenant governor, where he helped develop annual statewide conferences on green building, created a state day to celebrate and defend rivers, and promoted measures such as rain gardens for water conservation. As governor, Quinn helped pass measures on solar and wind energy, including sourcing electricity for the state capitol from wind power, and helped secure funding for high-speed rail in the midwest corridor. As Governor and Lt. Governor, Quinn Co-Chaired the Illinois Green Government Council, a council that focused on greening state government and reducing waste.  The Illinois Green Government Council produced public annual sustainability reports tracking overall state government energy usage, fuel usage, water usage, and waste  In 2010 and 2014, the Sierra Club, Illinois's largest environmental group, endorsed Quinn, calling him "The Green Governor." Quinn faced protests and strong opposition from environmentalists after his support for a controversial law to regulate and launch fracking.

Social issues
On March 9, 2011, Quinn signed the bill which abolished the death penalty in Illinois. On signing the bill, Quinn stated,

"It is impossible to create a perfect system, one that is free of all mistakes, free of all discrimination with respect to race or economic circumstance or geography. To have a consistent, perfect death penalty system, I have concluded, after looking at everything I've been given, that that's impossible in our state. I think it's the right and just thing to abolish the death penalty."

In an interview with The New York Times, Quinn attributed his decision to the late Cardinal Joseph Bernardin who had argued until the end of his life for a “consistent ethic of life" that included opposing capital punishment. To date, capital punishment is still outlawed in Illinois.

On May 17, 2012, Quinn appointed Brandon Bodor to be Executive Director of the Serve Illinois Commission. On September 11, 2012, the two announced that the Corporation for National and Community Service (CNCS) had awarded $8.4 million to enable 1,200 volunteers in 29 AmeriCorps programs to better serve Illinois communities.

Quinn is an advocate for gun control, supporting an assault weapons ban, high-capacity magazine ban and universal background checks for Illinois. Quinn has also been known for criticizing concealed carry legislation in Illinois (which would allow a person to have a concealed handgun on their person in public), and the National Rifle Association. Despite this opposition, the Illinois General Assembly legalized concealed carry in the state on July 9, 2013, overriding Quinn's veto.  This made Illinois the last state in the U.S. to enact this type of legislation.

In Quinn's 2013 State of the State address, he declared his commitment to the legalization of same sex marriage. After a months-long battle in the legislature, Quinn signed the Religious Freedom and Marriage Fairness Act into law on November 20, 2013, before a crowd of thousands, making Illinois the 16th state in the nation to legalize same-sex marriage. He had previously signed a bill legalizing civil unions on January 31, 2011.

Post-gubernatorial activities 

Quinn has kept a low profile since leaving office, volunteering for causes like veterans' affairs and consumer protection. Quinn has been critical of his successor, Bruce Rauner, calling him "anti-worker" and "dishonest." He has stated that he is interested in grassroots petitions.

On June 12, 2016, Quinn announced a new petition drive called Take Charge Chicago to put a binding referendum on the Chicago ballot to place a two-term limit on the Mayor of Chicago and create a new elected position called the Consumer Advocate. As of mid-2017, that is still ongoing.

On October 27, 2017, Quinn announced he would run for Illinois Attorney General in the 2018 election. Quinn was generally regarded as the most well-known candidate in the race, however he narrowly lost the nomination to State Senator Kwame Raoul on March 20, 2018.

For the 2020 election cycle, Quinn championed a citizens initiated ballot item which would ask voters in Evanston whether the city should adopt a system under which binding citizen initiated referendums to create city ordinances would be allowed. This ballot question was rejected by the city's election board, a decision subsequently upheld in the Circuit Court of Cook County and the Illinois Appeals Court.

During the 2023 Chicago mayoral election, Quinn flirted with the idea of running for Chicago mayor, going as far as collecting signatures to appear on the ballot. However, he declined to run in the election and subsequently endorsed U.S. Representative Chuy Garcia's candidacy.

Electoral history

For Illinois Attorney General

As Governor of Illinois (with Lt. Governor)

2014

2010

As Lt. Governor (with Governor)
 2006 Election for Governor/Lieutenant Governor of Illinois
 Rod Blagojevich/Pat Quinn (D) (inc.), 49.79%
 Judy Baar Topinka/Joe Birkett (R), 39.26%
 Rich Whitney/Julie Samuels (Green), 10.36%
 2002 Election for Governor / Lieutenant Governor
 Rod Blagojevich/Pat Quinn (D), 52%
 Jim Ryan/Carl Hawkinson (R), 45%

For Illinois Secretary of State
 1994 – Illinois Secretary of State
 George Ryan (R) (inc.) 61.5%
 Pat Quinn (D) 38.5%

As state treasurer
 1990 – Illinois Treasurer
 Pat Quinn (D) 55.7%
 Greg Baise (R) 44.3%

References

Further reading 
 Barone, Michael,  and Chuck McCutcheon, The Almanac of American Politics: 2012  (2011) pp 512–14

External links 

 Illinois Governor Pat Quinn official Illinois government site
 Pat Quinn campaign website
 Pat Quinn for Governor

|-

|-

|-

|-

1948 births
20th-century American lawyers
20th-century American politicians
21st-century American politicians
American people of Irish descent
American gun control activists
Democratic Party governors of Illinois
Walsh School of Foreign Service alumni
Illinois lawyers
Lieutenant Governors of Illinois
Living people
Northwestern University Pritzker School of Law alumni
People from Hinsdale, Illinois
Politicians from Chicago
State treasurers of Illinois
Tax lawyers
Members of the Cook County Board of Appeals